"Siberian Breaks" is a song by the American rock band MGMT, released as the second single from their second studio album Congratulations (2010) as an exclusive release part of Record Store Day on April 17, 2010. It is the longest track on the album and MGMT's second longest song to date, clocking in a minute and a half behind "Metanoia." Andrew VanWyngarden has said that Siberian Breaks is his favorite song on the album. The song was released as a limited-edition 12" blue marble vinyl single for Record Store Day 2010, featuring the full 12-minute album version of "Siberian Breaks" on side A, with side B featuring a special etched design. There were 2000 copies pressed and it has been said to be "the perfect companion piece to the album". VanWyngarden has said of the song, "It's kind of like eight different songs strung together into one, and the general theme is about surfing in the Arctic Circle by Russia."

Charts

Personnel

Andrew VanWyngarden – vocals, guitar, bass, drums, harmonica, percussion, electric sitar, synthesizer, composer, lyricist
Ben Goldwaaser – synthesizer, numerology, samples, percussion, composer 
James Richardson – guitar, panpipes, percussion 
Matt Asti – guitar, bass, percussion 
Will Bermann – guitar, percussion
Sonic Boom – producer, "first documented use of the EMT 250 reverb "glitch""
Gillian Rivers – strings
Dave Cadden – oboe, sundries
Billy Bennett – engineer
Matt Boynton – engineer
Dave Fridmann – mixing engineer, engineer
Daniel Johnson – assistant engineer
Greg Calbi – mastering engineer

References

External links
 
 MGMT's Congratulations website

2010 singles
MGMT songs
Record Store Day releases
2010 songs
Columbia Records singles
Songs written by Andrew VanWyngarden
Songs written by Benjamin Goldwasser